Molla Ahmad Mosque or Nasir ad-Din Gashtasib mosque is a historical mosque of the 14th century. It is a part of Old City and located on Sabir street, in the city of Baku, in Azerbaijan. The building was also registered as a national architectural monument by the decision of the Cabinet of Ministers of the Republic of Azerbaijan dated August 2, 2001, No. 132.

History
The monument is in the type of mahallah mosque of the Old City. It was ordered by Nasraddin Gushtаsi ibn Hasan Hаjibаbа and constructed by architect-master, Mahmud ibn Sa'd in the early XIV century, who also built Nardaran Castle (1301) and mosque with minarets in Bibi-Heybat village. The monument was named after Ahmad by local residents, who was the akhoond of the mosque.

Architectural features
The mosque is quadrangular. It consists of a single small-sized hall. On the southern wall a simple mihrab, low shaped stone dome with crowns on sides, are installed. Its asymmetrical facade is finished with precisely profiled entrance and two windows, which were added in later period.

On the upper part of the mosque there is an inscription in Arabic. The two-lined writing gives detailed information about construction date of the mosque, its client, and as well as the architect, who took an active role in constructing military, religious and memorial buildings and structures. In his works, influence of Shirvanshahs period is observed.

Gallery

See also
Gileyli Mosque
Chin Mosque
Khidir Mosque
Takyeh

References

Monuments and memorials in Azerbaijan
Mosques in Baku
Icherisheher